Laura D. Beers  is an American author and historian. She is an associate professor of history at American University, where she researches modern Britain, mass media, and politics.

Education 
Beers earned a bachelor of arts, summa cum laude, in history from Princeton University in 2000. In 2003, she completed a master of arts in history from Harvard University. She completed a Ph.D. in history at Harvard in 2007. From October 2007 to September 2008, she was a postdoctoral fellow at University of Cambridge through funding from the Economic and Social Research Council. Beers was a postdoctoral fellow at Newnham College, Cambridge from October 2008 to August 2009.

Career and research 
Beers is an associate professor in the department of history at American University College of Arts and Sciences. She is an affiliate assistant professor in the American University School of International Service. She researches modern Britain and the way politics both influences and is influenced by cultural and social life. Beers explores mass media and modern society. She is the author and editor of three books. Beers speaks French, Italian, Spanish, and English.

Awards and honors 
Beers is a fellow of the Royal Historical Society.

Selected works

References

External links
 

Living people
21st-century American women writers
21st-century American historians
American women historians
American University faculty and staff
Princeton University alumni
Harvard Graduate School of Arts and Sciences alumni
Historians of the United Kingdom
Fellows of the Royal Historical Society
Year of birth missing (living people)